Guzmania spectabilis is a plant species in the genus Guzmania. This species is native to Costa Rica and Ecuador.

References

spectabilis
Flora of Costa Rica
Flora of Ecuador